This article lists events relating to rail transport that occurred during the 1750s.

1755

Births

September births
 September 13 – Oliver Evans, pioneering American steam locomotive designer and inventor (died 1819).

1756

Births

February births
 February 23 – Franz Josef Gerstner, pioneering Austrian railway engineer and physicist (died 1832).

1758

Events

June events
 June 9 – The Middleton Railway is the first in Great Britain to be granted powers by Act of Parliament. It is built by Charles Brandling to carry coal from his pits at Middleton into Leeds and is at this time a wooden, horse-drawn wagonway with a gauge of 4 ft 1 in (1.254 m); much rebuilt it survives as a heritage railway.

See also
 Years in rail transport

References